Cronos is a 1992 Mexican independent horror drama film written and directed by Guillermo del Toro and starring Federico Luppi and Ron Perlman. Cronos is del Toro's first feature film, and the first of several films on which he worked with Luppi and Perlman. The film was selected as the Mexican entry for the Best Foreign Language Film at the 66th Academy Awards, but was not accepted as a nominee. A stand-alone sequel, We Are What We Are, was released in 2010, with the only connection being Daniel Giménez Cacho reprising his role as Tito the Coroner.

Plot 
In the year 1536, an alchemist in Veracruz develops a mechanism that can give eternal life. In 1937, an old building collapses and the alchemist, who has marble-white skin, is killed when his heart is pierced by the debris. Investigators go to search the home of the alchemist, but they never reveal what else was discovered in the home: Basins filled with blood from a corpse.

In 1996, an old, somewhat religious antique dealer, Jesús Gris, notices the base of an archangel statue is hollow. He opens it and finds a 450-year-old mechanical object. After he winds the ornate, scarab-shaped device, it unfurls spider-like legs which grip him tightly, and inserts a needle into his skin, which injects him with an unidentified solution.  An insect — entombed within the device and meshed with the internal clockwork — produces the solution.  Gris eventually discovers his health and vigor are returning, as is his youth. His skin loses its wrinkles, his hair thickens and his sexual appetite increases. He also develops a thirst for blood. This at first disgusts him, but he eventually succumbs to the temptation. He then uses the device later that night, but says his nightly prayer as he does. His granddaughter Aurora notices this, and begins to worry about Gris.

Meanwhile, a rich, dying businessman, Dieter de la Guardia, who has been amassing information about the device for many years, has been searching for the archangel statue with the Cronos device. He has appropriated several archangels already. He sends his thuggish American nephew Angel, who suffers his uncle's abuse on a daily basis for an inheritance, to purchase the archangel at the antique shop.

During a New Year's Eve party, Gris sees a man bleeding from the nose and follows him into the men's room and waits for a chance to get his blood off of the sink countertop. Another man comes out of one of the stalls, sees the blood and cleans it up. Gris notices blood on the floor and decides to lick it up, until an unknown man walks up and kicks him in the face, which knocks him unconscious. Gris appears to be asleep in Angel's car and Angel gives him some alcohol and then tries to beat him into giving up the device. When Gris faints, Angel places his body inside a car and pushes it off a cliff. Gris briefly awakens and prays for survival, but seemingly dies. He later revives in an undertaker's establishment and escapes before he can be cremated.  He returns to his home where Aurora lets him in. Dieter beats Angel for not ensuring Gris's heart was destroyed, and sends him to check on the body. Gris works on a letter to his wife in which he comments on the changes to his body, and tells her that after completing some 'unfinished business' he will return to her. He notices that his skin burns in the presence of sunlight and sleeps in a box to avoid it.

Eventually, he and Aurora bring the device to Dieter's headquarters, where the businessman offers him a "way out" in exchange for the device. Gris comments on his damaged skin and the businessman tells him to peel it off because he has new skin underneath, which is marble-white like the dead alchemist. Gris threatens to destroy the device, but is told that he will die should that happen. Gris agrees to hand it over in exchange for knowing the "way out", whereupon Dieter stabs him. Before being able to strike the killing blow to the chest, Dieter is incapacitated by Aurora and Gris feeds on Dieter. Angel finds the dying Dieter and crushes his throat with his foot, tired of his abuse and waiting for his inheritance. Angel confronts Gris on the rooftop of the building and beats him severely. Gris throws them both off the roof, killing Angel.

Aurora finds Gris unconscious, and uses the device to wake him.  Noticing that her hand is bleeding, Gris is tempted to feed off his granddaughter, but he eventually controls himself. He then painfully destroys the device, despite previous warnings. Surprised to still be alive, he believes God to have saved him because of his attempted self-sacrifice. He returns to his home and lies in bed with Aurora and his wife, waiting for the rising sun to see if he is free of the effects from the device.

Cast 
 Federico Luppi as Jesús Gris
 Ron Perlman as Angel de la Guardia
 Claudio Brook as Dieter de la Guardia
 Tamara Shanath as Aurora Gris
 Margarita Isabel as Mercedes Gris
 Daniel Giménez Cacho as Tito the Coroner, a character that also appears in the 2010 horror film We Are What We Are.
 Mario Iván Martínez as Alchemist
 Farnesio de Bernal as Manuelito
 Jorge Martínez de Hoyos as Narrator

Reception

Critical response 
The film received acclaim by critics for its acting, originality, mythology, religious references, and its balance of horror and drama. When the film got the attention of international film critics including those from United States, it has since been recognized as one of the greatest horror films and Spanish language films of all-time. Rotten Tomatoes reports an 89% approval rating based on 55 reviews, with an average rating of 7.2/10. The critical consensus reads: "Guillermo del Toro's unique feature debut is not only gory and stylish, but also charming and intelligent." It was also entered into the 18th Moscow International Film Festival.

In the early 2010s, Time Out conducted a poll with several authors, directors, actors and critics who have worked within the horror genre to vote for their top horror films. Cronos was placed at number 96 on their top 100 list.

The film has become part of The Criterion Collection. The film's Blu-ray disc includes the film with both the introduction in English, and a version in its original Spanish language. In the website's plot synopsis of the film, it's described as "A dark, visually rich, & emotionally captivating fantasy". The film is sold separately, and as part of a movie collection named, "Trilogía de Guillermo del Toro", which includes del Toro's other Spanish language horror films The Devil's Backbone & Pan's Labyrinth.

Box office 
In North America, the film was given limited release to only 2 theaters where it grossed $17,538 its opening weekend and grossed a total of $621,392 playing at a total of 28 screens. After many critics viewed the film, they felt it deserved a wider release.

Year-end lists 
 Honorable mention – David Elliott, The San Diego Union-Tribune

Home media 
Cronos was first released on DVD by Lionsgate Home Entertainment on 14 October 2003 as a "10th Anniversary Edition", which includes two commentaries, one by del Toro, and the other by three of the four producers, two behind-the-scenes featurettes, two galleries for production photos and concept art, and an easter egg which plays the theatrical trailers of four films, including Cronos. On 7 December 2010, The Criterion Collection released Cronos on both DVD and Blu-ray with a new cover by Mike Mignola. The disc contains two audio commentaries by cast and crew, a video tour of del Toro's home office, several interviews, and Geometria, a 1987 short film (although finished in 2010) written and directed by del Toro. The Criterion Collection also released the film as a part of the box set "Trilogía de Guillermo del Toro" that includes three of Guillermo del Toro's Spanish films, the other two being Pan's Labyrinth and The Devil's Backbone.

See also 
 Vampire film
 List of submissions to the 66th Academy Awards for Best Foreign Language Film
 List of Mexican submissions for the Academy Award for Best Foreign Language Film

References

External links 
 
 
 
 
 
 
 Cronos: Beautiful Dark Things an essay by Maitland McDonagh at the Criterion Collection

1992 films
1992 horror films
1990s Spanish-language films
1990s English-language films
Films directed by Guillermo del Toro
Films with screenplays by Guillermo del Toro
Films shot in Mexico
Mexican independent films
Mexican vampire films
Gothic horror films
Films set in Mexico
1992 directorial debut films
Mexican supernatural horror films
1990s Mexican films